Oligocarpus calendulaceus  is a plant in the Asteraceae family. It was first described as Osteospermum calendulaceum in 1782 by Carl Linnaeus the Younger. In 1832, Christian Friedrich Lessing assigned it to the genus Oligocarpus in his Synopsis Generum Compositarum. (This is the name accepted by the Australian Plant Name Index, but Plants of the World Online accepts Osteospermum calendulaceum.)

In South Africa, it is native to the Cape Provinces, Free State, KwaZulu-Natal, Lesotho, Northern Provinces, and Eswatini. It has been introduced into Hawaii, and Australia, where it is found in South Australia and Western Australia.  In Australia, it is an agricultural weed, and found mainly in arid areas on lagoon shores, and on plains.

References

External links
Oligocarpus calendulaceus images and occurrence data from GBIF

Taxa named by Carl Linnaeus the Younger
Plants described in 1782
Flora of South Africa
Calenduleae